The Soap Opera Digest Award for Outstanding Lead Actress in a Daytime Drama is an award held by the daytime television magazine Soap Opera Digest. It was first awarded at the 1st Soap Opera Digest Award ceremony in 1984.  It is given to honor an actress who has delivered an outstanding performance in a leading role while working within the soap opera genre industry. The winners  are decided by the fans who read the magazine.

Deidre Hall holds the most wins, winning in 1984, 1985 and 1995. Hall is followed by Kim Zimmer who won twice in 1988 and 2000.

Winners

Total awards won

Multiple wins

References

Soap Opera Digest Awards
Television awards for Best Actress
Awards established in 1984